The Tarcutta Creek, part of the Murray Darling basin, is mostly a perennial stream located in the Riverina region of New South Wales, Australia.

Course and features
The stream flows generally north by west towards the town of  where the creek is crossed by the Hume Motorway. The creek descends  over its  course.

See also
 List of rivers of Australia

References

External links

Rivers of New South Wales
Rivers in the Riverina
Hume Highway